The Music City Star, officially known as the WeGo Star,  is a commuter rail service running between Nashville and Lebanon, Tennessee. The service uses the existing track of the Nashville and Eastern Railroad. The line stops at seven stations: Riverfront, Donelson, Hermitage, Mt. Juliet, Martha, Hamilton Springs and Lebanon. Service began on September 18, 2006.

Description 
The Star is considered a "starter" project to demonstrate the effectiveness of commuter rail service to the metro Nashville area. Expansion plans include as many as six more lines, terminating in Gallatin, Columbia, Murfreesboro, Dickson, Springfield, and Clarksville via Ashland City. All are planned to use existing CSX Transportation railroad lines. The planned seven lines meet in central Nashville in a star formation, hence the name of the system, which also alludes to the city's many country music stars.

The Star is the first passenger train service of any kind for Nashville since the discontinuation of Amtrak's Floridian in 1979. The Nashville and Eastern line, part of the former Tennessee Central Railway, had not seen passenger service for many decades prior to the Star, with the exception of excursion trains operated by the Tennessee Central Railway Museum and the Broadway Dinner Train.

Rolling stock 

The Music City Star regional rail service is currently served by four rebuilt ex-Amtrak EMD F40PH locomotives and seven former Chicago Metra coaches, standard gauge. The coaches are bilevel rail cars with seating on both levels.

Since 2022, all four F40PH locomotives have been rebuilt and repainted into the new WeGo paint scheme. 381 previously wore Amtrak's Pacific Surfliner paint scheme until late 2020. The coaches used also saw an overhaul; the former Metra Pullman-Standard coaches were withdrawn from service around 2020 and were replaced with corrugated stainless steel Budd bi-level gallery coaches formerly used by Chicago Burlington and Quincy, RTA, Metra, and the planned MiTrain. Despite this, the older cars are still active on occasion.

Lines 

Currently there is only one line, with six more planned to other satellite cities around Nashville.

The line is mostly single-track, so this limits arrivals and departures to how long each train has to wait for the other to pass. The first "starter line" cost $41 million, or just under $1.3 million per mile, which made it the most cost-efficient commuter rail start-up in the nation.

East Corridor line 
 Riverfront station
 Donelson station
 Hermitage station
 Mt. Juliet station
 Martha station
 Hamilton Springs station
Lebanon station

Ridership 
Music City Star ridership steadily increased from 104,785 passenger trips in 2007 to 277,148 trips in 2012. In 2013, ridership decreased to 253,421 trips, but then steadily increased to 298,800 passenger trips in 2018. in 2019 ridership has slightly decreased to 292,500 passenger trips. During the 2020 pandemic, ridership plummeted to 77,200 with a majority of the rides being in the first quarter of the year, it fell further in 2021 to 57,500 although the 4th quarter saw immense improvement compared to the 4th quarter of 2020.

History 
The train began operations on September 18, 2006, becoming the 18th commuter rail system in the United States, with a projected daily ridership of 1,500 passengers. The service launched with an estimated annual cost of $3.3 million, of which $1.3 million was covered by revenues.

In the first month after service began, ridership failed to reach the projected goals, a situation which continued for several years, culminating with a financial shortfall of $1.7 million by the summer of 2008, of which the state of Tennessee covered $1 million in a bailout of the service. Financial difficulties continued into the next year; in June 2009, the service was nearly shut down for lack of funds until state and local authorities granted the service $4.4 million to continue service until 2011.

During 2010, a third passenger car was added to all Music City Star trains to accommodate increasing ridership.

On May 2, 2010, the East Corridor line was closed because of damage related to the floods that hit Middle Tennessee. Flood waters pushed tracks off a concrete trestle over Sinking Creek in downtown Lebanon. This trapped Star trains at their Lebanon storage yard, causing RTA to suspend service until the trestle was repaired. MTA substituted chartered buses instead, picking up passengers at all stations except Martha. The line was repaired in one week.

The COVID-19 pandemic in Tennessee in 2020 briefly resulted in the shutdown of Star rail service, but service resumed on June 15, 2020 with eight trains each weekday — two each way in the morning and two more in the afternoon.

A proposed expansion of the system to Clarksville and Ashland City is projected to cost $525 million.

See also 
 List of United States railroads
 List of Tennessee railroads

References

External links 

 Music City Star official website

 
Train-related introductions in 2006
Passenger rail transportation in Tennessee
Tennessee railroads
Transportation in Nashville, Tennessee
Commuter rail in the United States